The 1964 Miami Hurricanes football team represented the University of Miami as an independent during the 1964 NCAA University Division football season. Led by first-year head coach Charlie Tate, the Hurricanes played their home games at the Miami Orange Bowl in Miami, Florida. Miami finished the season 4–5–1.

Schedule

Roster
 S Andy Sixkiller

References

Miami
Miami Hurricanes football seasons
Miami Hurricanes football